Group B of the 1997 FIFA Confederations Cup took place between 13 and 17 December 1997. Uruguay won the group, and advanced to the knockout stage, along with group runners-up Czech Republic. United Arab Emirates and South Africa failed to advance.

Standings

Results

United Arab Emirates v Uruguay

South Africa v Czech Republic

United Arab Emirates v South Africa

Czech Republic v Uruguay

United Arab Emirates v Czech Republic

Uruguay v South Africa

References

B
1997–98 in Emirati football
1997–98 in Czech football
1997–98 in South African soccer
1997 in Uruguayan football